The Central Bank of Libya (CBL) is the monetary authority in Libya. It has the status of an autonomous corporate body. The law establishing the CBL stipulates that the objectives of the central bank shall be to maintain monetary stability in Libya and to promote the sustained growth of the economy in accordance with the general economic policy of the state.

The headquarters of the Central Bank are in Tripoli. However, to make the CBL services more accessible to commercial banks, branches and public departments located far from the headquarters. The CBL has three branches, located in Benghazi, Sabha and Sirte.

History
The CBL was founded in 1955 under Act no. 30 (1955) started its operations on 1 April 1956 under the name of National Bank of Libya, to replace the Libyan Currency committee which was established by the United Nations and other supervising countries in 1951 to ensure the well-being of the weak and poor Libyan economy.

The bank was established in the former Savings Bank building, designed in 1921 by Armando Brasini and completed in the early 1930s.

The Bank's name was changed to Bank of Libya under Act no. 4 (1963), then to its current name Central Bank of Libya after the 1969 coup d'état.

In March 2011, the governor of CBL, Farhat Bengdara, resigned and defected to the rebelling side of the Libyan Civil War, having first arranged for the bulk of external Libyan assets to be frozen and unavailable to the Gaddafi government.

On 6 December 2021, Tripoli-based Governor of the CBL Saddek Elkaber met with Bayda-based CBL governor, Ali Al-Hibri, who before the split had been Elkaber's Deputy Governor, in Tunisia and agreed to start unification of the CBL. On 20 January 2022, Elkaber and Al-Hibri signed an agreement on a four-stage unification plan, with the appointment of Deloitte to oversee the process.

Governors
This is list governors of The Central Bank of Libya since its establishment.
|29 يناير 2018  The Bank endured twice an administration split, first during the first civil war, (February–August 2011), then from September 2014 on, as a result of the ongoing civil war.

See also

Libyan dinar
Ministry of Finance (Libya)
List of banks in Libya
Payment system
Real-time gross settlement
List of central banks of Africa

References

External links
 (in English)

Libya
Banks of Libya
Buildings and structures in Tripoli, Libya
1955 establishments in Libya
Banks established in 1955
Organizations based in Tripoli, Libya